Rosanna Cabot is a fictional character on the American daytime soap opera, As the World Turns. The character was created by Yvonne Perry, who portrayed her from 1992 to 1999. In 2002, Daytime Emmy-winner Cady McClain took over the role and was consequently nominated twice for "Outstanding Supporting Actress" in 2003 and 2004, winning the award in the later year, becoming the most recognized actress for the role of Rosanna.

Casting and creation
The role of Rosanna was originated by actress Yvonne Perry. Perry portrayed Rosanna from 1992 until her exit in 1999. In 2002, it was announced that actress Cady McClain, most known for her portrayal of Dixie Cooney on ABC's soap opera, All My Children, had been cast in the role of Rosanna.

In a letter on her official site, McClain spoke about why she chose to take the role of Rosanna. She stated:

Personally, after Sept 11th, I started to reevaluate my life, as many of us have. I realized I was tired, creatively and physically, and I needed...something. A break, a change, something different to wake up my insides. It is hard work being an actor; it takes a lot of constant revitalization to give as much energy as we do. Originally, I had no real "plan." I just wanted to leave contract status and "keep the door open," as we say, so that Dixie could come back here and there. I still feel that way. She is pregnant, in Europe, and with a delicate physical condition, so...anything could happen in any amount of time. The powers that be were kind enough to leave me with this exit, and I am so very grateful to them. I never have taken their kindnesses for granted, nor do I intend to. It is just too important to me for that.

When I was approached a few weeks after I shot my last day at AMC with the idea of coming to ATWT for a little stint to try out an old character that they were working on, I felt very flattered and interested to join the cast and try something new. I don't think you know this, but I have been a huge fan of ATWT. I know almost the characters, and who they've been involved with. I even feel a little star struck around certain actors who shall remain nameless! 

McClain continued to portray the role, earning two nominations for "Outstanding Supporting Actress" during the 2003 and 2004 Daytime Emmys, the latter of which she won. In 2004, it was heavily rumored that McClain had been let go from the series due to budget cuts. However, executive producer quickly debunked such rumors, stating, "As far as the show is concerned, Cady McClain is and will continue to be a valued cast member of As The World Turns. Cady has brought her incredible talent to her portrayal of Rosanna, as witnessed by last year's [Outstanding Supporting Actress] Emmy nomination. Cady and her character are definitely part of future story plans.".

In early 2005, McClain announced her decision to depart the series, which sparked the interest of the actress returning to her All My Children counterpart, Dixie. McClain returned to the role of Dixie following her World Turns exit. McClain's last airdate as Rosanna aired on July 29, 2005. McClain then returned to All My Children later that year.

Following McClain's departure, rumors began to fuel a possible recast of the character. However, this was not the case. In May 2007, it was announced that McClain would once again resurrect the character of Rosanna, following her firing from All My Children. She returned to the role on July 30, 2007 McClain's return was cut short, the actress announced her decision decided to leave the show once again, due to the upset she had over the loss of dignity the character once had. She last aired on January 28, 2008.

Following her As the World Turns departure, it was rumored that McClain would join the cast of "Guiding Light" in the role of Harley Cooper. However, those rumors were debunked when McClain stated she had no intentions of joining the soap and later announced that she had agreed to once again return to As the World Turns. However, it was stated that her stint would not be permanent. She appeared from May 2009 to December 18, 2009. McClain then returned again in September 2010 for the finale of the series.

Controversy
Actress Cady McClain was upset with the direction Rosanna's character went during her return in 2007. When asked how her exit was in an interview with Soap Opera Weekly, she said, "Let’s put it this way: As the person who plays this character, it was an emotional hysterectomy. Rosanna’s womb, adopted child, and business exited stage left. Apparently, there was nothing left to take but her dignity." She later added, "I don’t know. I cannot understand why in a medium that caters to women, intelligent female characters have to be set up to be stupid and emotionally impulsive… 'punished' for actions they would never have taken without a gun to their head… and left begging and pathetic. As an actress, it was not romantic. It was embarrassing. Almost as bad as the pancakes, and that’s saying something. I have to wonder what the hell is going on these days. Are strong, smart women so threatening that they have to be vilified? I think they should be celebrated, but what do I know? Maybe I need a boob job."

In 2009, McClain took part in an interview with soapcentral.com owner Dan J. Kroll. During the interview, McClain stated that she did not think anyone in daytime would hire her again and that she would not apologize for being honest.

Storylines

1992–99
Rosanna is the only child born to the marriage of Alexander Cabot and Sheila Washburn. She arrives in Oakdale in 1992,  wanting to have a small-town experience like her mother, who has recently died. She goes on to live at the Snyder farm and becomes very close to Emma Snyder (Kathleen Widdoes). Despite trying to pass herself off as an average girl, Evan Walsh eventually discovered that Rosanna is an heiress and is worth millions. Rosanna dates farm boy Hutch Hutchison, but their relationship is ruined due to his fling with Debbie Simon. She then dates Evan briefly. Rosanna's father Alexander marries Evan's snobbish mother Edwina, who she does not get on with.

Rosanna meets mechanic Mike Kasnoff, who she goes on to date. They are one of the show's supercouples, but they clash due to her wealth and his status as an ex-convict. Rosanna's father disapproved of Mike and during an argument, Alexander dies of a heart attack. He leaves Rosanna all of his money. Although Rosanna wants nothing to do with the money or power her father has bestowed upon her, and Mike very much wanted her to rid herself of the money, Rosanna's relationship with Mike collapsed before she could give away her fortune.

In 1995, Carly Tenney arrives in Oakdale and plotted to worm her way into Rosanna's life, knowing she was also Sheila's daughter. Sheila had abandoned her daughter and marriage to Ray Tenney to run off with Alexander Cabot when Carly was a child and the latter swore she would receive a slice of the good life as well. Carly secretly slept with Mike Kasnoff, Rosanna's fiancé, and became pregnant. She interrupted Mike and Rosanna's wedding with her bombshell. After the truth was revealed, Carly and Rosanna were constantly at each other's throats and though she eventually reconciled with Mike, she became addicted to gambling. When they tried to elope in Atlantic City, Rosanna was so busy playing the slot machines that she barely remembered she was there for a wedding. They did not go through with the ceremony. Tragedy struck during an argument the sisters were having. Rosanna who had had enough, turned to walk away when Carly grabbed her hand to stop her. When Rosanna jerked her hand away, Carly fell and went into premature labor. She later gave birth to a stillborn child, Nora, named after Mike's late mother. When Mike hesitated to assure Rosanna that the baby's death was not her fault, Rosanna knew the relationship was over and left for Europe with a message for Carly: she would receive $50 million if she gave birth to a child in wedlock, provided the man was not Mike Kasnoff. Later, she added a deadline to the deal. Carly had to give birth by December 31, 1998. Surprisingly, Carly made the deadline when she gave birth to her son and Rosanna's nephew, Parker Munson, but she had committed fraud in the process and thus, nullifying her claim to the money. Rosanna took back the $50 million from her sister but set up a trust fund for her nephew, not wanting him to suffer in lieu of his mother's greed.

2002–05
When Rosanna returned from Europe in 2002, she was given temporary custody of Parker. This made her the town pariah who believed that she had obtained the child simply to hurt Carly, who was incapable of caring for her son at the time. She shared an emotional reunion with Mike in August 2002. She also struck a friendship with Craig Montgomery who was infatuated with her sister. This later turned into romance and the duo married in a low-key ceremony. Carly and Rosanna also finally put aside their differences when her sister gave birth to her niece, Sage Snyder.

Sage's birth led Rosanna to want a child of her own but having undergone a hysterectomy, she chose to adopt. Craig, having lost his son, Bryant, didn't want another child but appeased Rosanna by agreeing. Later, she found out her husband had been sabotaging their adoption process and was prepared to leave him before Craig showed up with a child at their home. Rosanna fell deeply in love with her new son whom they named Cabot, and reveled in motherhood and a newfound friendship with Paul Ryan in the next few months. Her happiness proved to be short-lived when she learnt Cabot had been illegally adopted which devastated Rosanna completely when she had to relinquish her rights to  her son and give him up to his Canadian birth mother. She left Oakdale to pull herself back together and when she returned a few weeks later, Rosanna served Craig with divorce papers. Though he attempted to fight her, she reminded him that she could take everything from him and was letting him off easy by letting him keep his money and Metro Court. She also consequently ended her friendship with Paul, who had turned Craig into the police, causing them to lose Cabot. In secret, however, Rosanna was concocting a plan with Carly to marry new BRO employee, Jordan Sinclair and wormed her way into his life. When Jordan learnt of her true intentions, he was enraged which prompted Rosanna to confess that Cabot's birth mother had promised her that if she married Jordan, her son would be returned to her. Not knowing why he was singled out and not appreciating having been used, Jordan refused to enter a marriage of convenience but changed his mind when Rosanna consequently had a breakdown upon his departure.

After marrying Jordan, they learnt that he was Cabot's biological father. The latter demanded a role in his son's life which unsettled Rosanna but she agreed. They also learnt that James Stenbeck had been instrumental in bringing them together and it was revealed that Stenbeck was Jordan's biological father. Realizing that this was his way of insinuating himself into their lives, Rosanna ran away with Cabot but was brought back by Jordan. Later, Stenbeck became increasingly diabolical when he demanded that Rosanna and Jordan consummate their marriage, which the latter refused to since he was in love with Jennifer Munson and Rosanna with Paul Ryan. His father retaliated by kidnapping both his wife and son and trapped them in a burning building. Though Paul managed to save Rosanna, Cabot seemingly died in the fire. Inconsolable with grief, Rosanna broke all ties with him and found comfort in Jordan's arms which effectively killed his relationship with Jennifer. Jordan soon left town after annulling their marriage. Rosanna then temporarily moved in with Emma Snyder to deal with her pain. She eventually forgave Paul and they later married.

Rosanna was haunted by visions of her son, however, and this went beyond the metaphysical when she kept finding Cabot's playthings out of storage. When the perpetrator was revealed to be Emily Stewart, an investigation was launched and it was later determined that Barbara Ryan, Rosanna's mother-in-law, had been drugging Emily to get back at Rosanna for marrying Paul, killing two birds with one stone by using a long-standing enmity with Emily to destroy her daughter-in-law emotionally. Barbara was also revealed to be in cahoots with her ex-husband, James Stenbeck, who had saved Cabot from the fire. He later revealed this to Rosanna, and demanded that she falsely implicate herself in Emily's drugging in order to spare Barbara from prosecution and additionally, end her marriage to Paul and leave town with him. Rosanna accomplished the former task before informing a heartbroken Paul that she hated him. Months later, she resurfaced in Bangkok, Thailand only to bump into her ex-husband, Craig. Though he assured her he would help her escape, she came to the realization that she would never be free under Stenbeck's thumb and made the decision to give Cabot up for adoption in order to ensure his safety.

Upon her return to Oakdale, Rosanna attempted to reconcile with Paul after telling him her ordeal. Hurt that she chose to turn to Craig for help instead of him, he wrote her off. At the same time, Craig was determined to obtain custody of his unborn child with Jennifer Munson and begged Rosanna to remarry him. This proved to be her downfall. Weeks earlier, Rosanna had met a pregnant teenager, Gwen Norbeck. Feeling sorry for her plight and wanting a family, she arranged for the adoption of Gwen's child when it was born. Craig was vehemently against the adoption but Rosanna defied his wishes and went ahead with the process. In a strange turn of events, Jennifer and Gwen both went into premature labor at the same time. Jennifer's baby seemingly died in the hospital and when Craig didn't show any signs of grief, Rosanna began to become suspicious taking into account his tireless efforts to gain custody of his son before his death. She became even more confused when Craig immediately took to their adopted child. When she realized that Craig must have switched the babies, Rosanna confronted him. He confessed to his crime and Rosanna, horrified, rushed out to tell the police. Craig, who was tailing her, continually hit the side of her car trying to get her to pull over but this caused his wife to crash as she was on the phone with Paul begging for help. Before she lost consciousness, she found the energy to tell him, "Wrong foot" before slipping into a coma. Craig was subsequently sent to jail for attempted murder and the baby was placed in Carly's custody. Rosanna has been comatose since 2005 when Carly and Jack sent her to a private clinic in Switzerland.

2007–08
In July 2007, Paul Ryan was in a coma after he fell from cliff during a fight with Craig Montgomery. Paul was brought to the same clinic as Rosanna. In his coma, he met Rosanna at the place between life and death. Paul woke up, asking for Rosanna. He went to her bed, pleading her to wake up. After he left her room, she woke up, smiling and saying his name. Paul promised her they would punish Craig for what he had done to her. A few weeks later, Craig received a call from the clinic, with the news that Rosanna has woken up and left the clinic. Craig became frightened, but it was too late. As he turned himself, he saw Paul Ryan, wheeling Rosanna into the room.

From that moment on, Craig has been trying to get into the good graces of Rosanna, but she wasn't interested. All she wanted was to be with Paul and get back at Craig for what he had done to her. Rosanna soon learned about the on and off relationship between Paul and Meg. She saw Meg as a threat, but when Paul married her on Halloween 2007, Rosanna was relieved and believed nothing could come between her and Paul anymore. However, Rosanna noticed Paul was still in love with Meg, so she met with Craig and demanded him to get Meg pregnant as soon as he could. A few weeks later, Meg was indeed pregnant. Both Craig and Rosanna were happy about this, until Rosanna learned that Megs baby wasn't Craig's, but Paul's. Rosanna switched the result of the tests that were done to find out who the father was. Meg and Craig heard that Craig was the father and once again, Rosanna felt safe now that Meg was bonded to Craig. Unfortunately for Rosanna, Craig found out the truth and discovered that Meg had cheated on him and the baby was Paul's. Craig fell back into his old habits and is currently looking for medication that will cause a miscarriage with Meg. On January 29, 2008, Rosanna slipped back into her coma.

2009–10
Rosanna appears again in May 2009. Upon being discovered by her ex-husband Paul (who was on the run with his daughter, Eliza), she reveals that after she woke up from her coma, she discovered that her assets had been wiped out, as Cabot Motors had failed during the recession, and the remainder of her assets were placed in a Ponzi scheme. She then moved to a co-op farm in the Midwest and worked there to make ends meet. She agrees to return to Oakdale if Paul accompanies her. Rosanna later reunites with Carly and is introduced to the relationship between Carly and Craig. Though originally against it, she agrees to be Carly's maid of honor before Carly goes missing and ends up in the hospital.

Rosanna begins to realize that Carly is an alcoholic after finding several hidden bottles of alcohol at Milltown. Along with Craig, Parker, Jack and Janet, the group hold an intervention, hoping to persuade Carly to go to rehab. After Carly agrees, Rosanna promises that she will live at Carly's home and assist with household duties, while helping Craig run the vitamin water company he and Carly own. After continuing bickering between each other, Rosanna and Craig rekindle their romance behind Carly's back. When Carly returned from rehab in November, she catches Craig in an embrace with Rosanna and the two confess to an affair. Carly threw Rosanna out of her house and broke off her engagement to Craig. After being thrown out of Carly's house, she and Craig continued their relationship and planned to marry. After witnessing first-hand that Craig still had feelings for Carly and vice versa, Rosanna left Craig at the altar and left town for Germany. After hearing that Craig did not intend to run her off the road and that it was merely at the thought of losing Johnny, she confesses to Carly that she's been set free from Craig and their past.

Rosanna returns to Oakdale in September 2010 for Jack and Carly's third wedding. She quickly brings the woes of her personal life with her to the wedding and comes to blows with Craig after meeting his son, Gabriel. Rosanna then reconciles with Craig and decides to help him co-parent Johnny.

External links
 Rosanna Cabot at  soapcentral.com
 As the World Turns CAST – Rosanna Cabot
 As The World Turns's Rosanna Cabot profile at sonypictures.com

References

As the World Turns characters
Television characters introduced in 1992
American female characters in television
Fictional female businesspeople